Crazy Love or Este loco amor loco is a 1979 Argentine comedy film directed by Eva Landeck.

Cast
Irene Morack
Carlos Calvo
Ignacio Quirós
Héctor Gióvine
Perla Santalla
Osvaldo Terranova
Hugo Arana
Ulises Dumont
Jorge Sassi
Arturo Maly
Silvina Rada
Nelly Prono
Rodolfo Machado
Golde Flami
Roberto Carnaghi
Marzenka Novak

External links
 

1979 films
Argentine comedy films
1970s Spanish-language films
1970s Argentine films